Jaden Charles (born 25 January 2002) is a professional footballer who plays as a left-back for Nuneaton Borough. He is the son of former England international Gary Charles. He previously played youth-team football for Derby County, where he won the Professional Development League U18 Division 1 title in 2018–19.

Club career

Youth years
Charles spent ten years at the Academy at Derby County, scoring three goals and providing six assists in 31 games for the under-18 team and featuring once for the under-23 team and playing three times in the UEFA Youth League. Derby won the Professional Development League U18 Division 1 title in the 2018–19 season, with Charles contributing one goal from 13 games. He scored a free-kick against Newcastle United U18 in February 2020 that saw him nominated for the League Football Education's Goal of the Month award. He chose to leave the club in August 2020.

Mansfield Town
On 24 March 2021, he signed with EFL League Two side Mansfield Town on a contract to run until the end of the 2020–21 season. Manager Nigel Clough gave Charles his senior debut on 1 May 2021, when he came on as 81st-minute substitute for Stephen Quinn in a 4–1 victory over Oldham Athletic at Field Mill.

York City (loan)
In August 2021, National League North outfit York City announced Charles on a one-month loan. He made his debut for the club in York's league defeat against Gloucester City the very same day, playing the full 90 minutes. He returned to his parent club on the 16th of September, having played 4 matches for York.

Hereford (loan)
On 15 October 2021, Charles joined National League North club Hereford F.C. on a one month loan deal.

Nuneaton Borough
In December 2021, Southern Football League club Nuneaton Borough F.C. announced the signing of Charles on an initial one-month loan. He made his debut for the club against Royston Town F.C. completing a full 90 minutes. On 5 February 2022 Charles scored his first goal for the club directly from a corner against Alvechurch F.C. and shortly after this had his loan spell extended until the end of the 2021/22 season. On 11 June 2022, Charles signed for the club on a permanent basis.

International career
Though born in England, Charles has represented the Republic of Ireland at under-18 level during Andy Reid's management spell in 2019. He made his debut as a 75th-minute substitute for Louie Watson in a 4–0 friendly defeat to Turkey.

Style of play
Charles is a left-back with pace and good passing ability, whose technical skills make him a dead-ball specialist.

Personal life
He is the son of former England international Gary Charles.

Statistics

Honours
Derby County U18
Professional Development League U18 Division 1: 2018–19

References

External links

2002 births
Living people
English footballers
Republic of Ireland association footballers
Republic of Ireland youth international footballers
Association football fullbacks
Derby County F.C. players
Mansfield Town F.C. players
York City F.C. players
Hereford F.C. players
Nuneaton Borough F.C. players
English Football League players
National League (English football) players
Southern Football League players